American singer Arcángel has released five studio albums and 16 singles.

Studio albums

Mixtapes

Singles

Other appearances

Non-album songs

Guest appearances

References

Hip hop discographies
Discographies of American artists
Contemporary R&B discographies